Hipperholme is a village in West Yorkshire, England, located between the towns of Halifax and Brighouse in the Hipperholme and Lightcliffe ward of the Metropolitan Borough of Calderdale. The population of this ward at the 2011 Census was 11,308.

Geography 
(Christ Church). Lightcliffe is a village immediately east of Hipperholme. The boundary between the two is blurred, as there are places named after Lightcliffe with Hipperholme postal addresses. Other nearby places include Hove Edge in the south, Southowram and Northowram to the southwest and the northwest, respectively, and Shelf in the north.

History 
Hipperholme is mentioned in the Domesday Book both as Hipperholme and as Huperun. Here the king held two carucates (an area of land used for taxation purposes which could notionally be ploughed by an eight-ox team in a season). Historically it was part of the West Riding of Yorkshire. The township of Hipperholme also included nearby Brighouse, Lightcliffe, and Hove Edge and was known as Hipperholme-with-Brighouse in the late 19th century.

Economy and commerce 
Traditional industries in Hipperholme were the manufacture of silk and cotton goods, coal mining, quarrying, and tannery. From Joseph Brooke's quarrying firm, founded in 1840 and known for their non-slip paving stones patented in 1898, arose Brookes Chemicals Ltd who initially produced pricric acid for military needs, and later bitumen road coatings. Both stone and chemical works ceased trading in 1969. Most of the Lightcliffe plant was sold in 1969 to Philips, manufacturer of electrical goods, and acquired in 1986 by Crosslee plc, who also produce electric household appliances and are one of the major employers in Calderdale. Following the closure of the factory, the site was allocated for a new residential development, to be called Crosslee Park.

Hipperholme is today a thriving village with many local shops and is home to several pubs including the Whitehall, the Traveller's Inn, the Hare and Hounds, the White Horse, the Halifax Steam Brewery with Cock o' the North Bar. A recent addition is the reopening of the former Country House as the Tannery.

Education 
The local state primary schools are Lightcliffe Church of England School and Cliffe Hill School. Secondary schools are Hipperholme Grammar School, a private school, and Lightcliffe Academy, a state school formerly known as Hipperholme and Lightcliffe, and before that until 1985 as Eastfield Secondary Modern School, which is in Lightcliffe. Hipperholme Grammar School has two sites, the junior school is on Wakefield road and the senior school on Bramley Lane.

Transport 
Hipperholme stands at a crossroads, which makes travel easy. A58 road connects it with Halifax and the M62 motorway, A644 road with Brighouse and Queensbury, and A649 road with Liversedge and the A62 road. There are frequent bus routes from Hipperholme to Halifax, Brighouse, Leeds and Bradford. The railway between Bradford and Halifax runs through Hipperholme and neighbouring Lightcliffe. Both villages had stations, though neither of them has remained open. Hipperholme station closed in 1953 and Lightcliffe station in 1965.

Culture and community 
Hipperholme and Lightcliffe's social institutions include the Old Brodleians Rugby Club, Lightcliffe Cricket Club, the Masonic Hall, Lightcliffe Golf Club and the Lightcliffe Club.

Religious sites

St. Matthew's on Wakefield Road in Lightcliffe is the local parish church of the Church of England. It was built in 1874 by W. Swindon Barber in the Gothic Revival style and is a Grade II listed structure, as is the nearby tower of its predecessor building which was built by William Mallinson and dates from 1775.

St John the Baptist Church of the same denomination is located north of Hipperholme on Coley Road. It was built in the early 16th century as a chapel of ease at the instigation of William Thorpe of Hipperholme, enlarged in 1596, 1631, and 1711, extensively renovated on the latter occasion, and replaced by a new building in 1816. The latter was built by William Bradley from Halifax and altered by Hodgson Fowler around 1900. It is a Grade II listed building.

Christ Church at the crossroads of Brighouse Road and Leeds Road was built as the Hipperholme Wesleyan Methodist Chapel, starting in 1870, by William Ives in Geometric Gothic style. It was renovated in 1888. After amalgamation with Lightcliffe United Reformed Church in 2003 it obtained its present name. It serves members of the United Reformed Church and the Methodist Church in a Local Ecumenic Partnership.

See also
Listed buildings in Hipperholme and Lightcliffe

References 

Villages in West Yorkshire
Geography of Calderdale
Brighouse